The Kalevala House was a planned huge building designed by Eliel Saarinen for the  in Helsinki, Finland in 1921, which was never built. It was to be built at the top of Munkkiniemi, close to the current Hotel Kalastajatorppa. The Kalevala House was to become not only the premises of the Kalevala Society, but also a center of Finnish culture: it would have included a Finnish cultural research institute, exhibition spaces, artists' workspaces and "research chambers". In addition, Finnish great men and Fennomen would have been buried in the crypt at the foot of the 80-meter-high main tower.

The construction of his own house had been part of the Kalevala Society's plans since its establishment in 1911. The project was driven especially by the sculptor , one of the founding members. The painter Akseli Gallen-Kallela, one of the club's influencers, instead became an opponent of the house project soon after Saarinen's drawings were completed, possibly because he feared it would compete for funding with his own major project, the Greater Kalevala (Suur-Kalevala). Soon, the majority of the club's board also turned against an expensive project. The requirement to build one's own house was not removed from the rules of the Kalevala Society until the early 2000s.

National "Kalevala religion" in the 20th century
Admiration of the Kalevala and Kalevala culture led to outright worship of the Kalevala in the early 20th century. In the true sense of the word, a national Kalevala religion was being created. It culminated in the construction project of the huge Kalevala House, the "Finnish Panthéon", during the interwar period. The initiative was taken in 1911 by the sculptor Alpo Sailo (1877–1955). Its altar would have been the Great Kalevala, a monumental giant book commissioned from Akseli Gallen-Kallela, each page of which would have been a magnificent painting. Sailo described:  There would have been a crypt under the house, a "tuonela" in which the great men of the nation would have been buried. Eliel Saarinen, a prominent architect of the National Romantic period, drew up the magnificent plans for the Kalevala House in 1921.

At this point, however, the project failed because Gallen-Kallela considered Saarinen's drawings too unnational. The idea was reheated in the jubilee of the Kalevala in 1935. At that time, Alpo Sailo commented on the house:  This civic religion thus contained a very strong conservative charge. However, due to a lack of financial resources, the Kalevala House never went beyond the drawings.

In the 20th century, it was very typical to seek support for political passions from folk poetry. In the aftermath of national romance, the heroic types of Kalevala poems were admired and the Kalevala was claimed to be essentially a war epic. In this spirit, the armored ships ordered for the Finnish Navy were named after Väinämöinen and Ilmarinen (1930–1931).

The Kalevala house, which rises to a height of more than 80 meters, was to be located in Munkkiniemi, where Sigurd Stenius, the owner of the area, had already promised it a plot of land.

References
Special

General
 Antti Manninen: Kalevalatalo oli 1920-luvun Guggenheim, p. A 12. Helsingin Sanomat, March 4, 2012. (in Finnish)

Further reading
 Uuno Taavi Sirelius: Kalevalatalo: Suomalaisen kulttuuritutkimuksen ahjo ja ohjelma. Helsinki, Otava, 1921. (in Finnish)
 Risto Pulkkinen: Suomalainen kansanusko. 2014. (in Finnish)

External links

 Mika Savela: Editorial 5/20: All That Is Solid Melts into Air? - Ark.fi

Buildings designed by Eliel Saarinen
Munkkiniemi
Unbuilt buildings and structures in Finland